Michelle Steele (born 8 March 1986) is an Australian skeleton racer who has competed since 2004. She finished 13th in the women's skeleton event at the 2006 Winter Olympics in Turin.

Steele's best finish at the FIBT World Championships was sixth in the women's skeleton event at St. Moritz in 2007. Her best finish in the World Cup was 3rd at Calgary in 2013.

She used to be a surf lifesaving athlete, and a level nine gymnast. Steele's surf lifesaving highlights including coming fourth in the open women's beach flags at the Australian Surf Lifesaving Championships in 2004, and being Queensland State Champion in open and under 19 beach flag events.

References

External links
 
 
 
 
 
 
 2006 women's skeleton results (todor66.com)

1986 births
Living people
Australian female skeleton racers
Olympic skeleton racers of Australia
Skeleton racers at the 2006 Winter Olympics
Skeleton racers at the 2014 Winter Olympics
People from Gladstone, Queensland
20th-century Australian women
21st-century Australian women